A constitutional referendum was held in Equatorial Guinea on 15 August 1982 following the overthrow and execution of Francisco Macías Nguema in the 1979 coup d'état. The new constitution replaced the 1973 document and appointed Teodoro Obiang Nguema Mbasogo president for seven years, as well as making provisions for the protection of human rights and limited political representation. It was passed by 95.8% of voters with a 93.5% turnout.

Results

References

1982 referendums
Referendums in Equatorial Guinea
1982 in Equatorial Guinea
Constitutional referendums in Equatorial Guinea